Troth is a surname. Notable people with the surname include:
Al Troth (1930–2012), American fisherman
Doris Troth Lippman (fl. 1967–present), American professor of nursing
Henry Troth (1859–1945), American photographer
 Paul Troth (quarterback) (born 1982), American college football quarterback
 Paul Troth (American football coach) (born c. 1962), American football coach